Rocco Francis Marchegiano (September 1, 1923 – August 31, 1969), better known as Rocky Marciano, was an American professional boxer who competed from 1947 to 1955, and held the world heavyweight title from 1952 to 1956. He is the only heavyweight champion to have finished his career undefeated. His six title defenses were against Jersey Joe Walcott (from whom he had taken the title), Roland La Starza, Ezzard Charles (twice), Don Cockell and Archie Moore.

Known for his relentless fighting style, formidable punching power, stamina, and exceptionally durable chin, Marciano is considered one of the greatest heavyweight boxers of all time. Marciano remains the only fighter to have stopped every opponent he ever faced for the world heavyweight title, and shares, with Joe Louis, the highest knockout-to-win percentage in world heavyweight title fights at 85.71%. His career knockout-to-win percentage of 87.8% remains one of the highest in heavyweight boxing history. Marciano is ranked #14 in The Ring magazine's list of the 100 greatest punchers of all time.

Early life
Born Rocco Francis Marchegiano, he was raised on the south side of Brockton, Massachusetts to Pierino Marchegiano and Pasqualina Picciuto. Both of his parents were immigrants from Italy. His father was from Ripa Teatina, Abruzzo, while his mother was from San Bartolomeo in Galdo, Campania. Rocky had two brothers, Louis (aka Sonny) and Peter, and three sisters, Alice, Concetta and Elizabeth. When he was about 18 months old, Marciano contracted pneumonia, from which he almost died.

In his youth, he worked out on homemade weightlifting equipment (later in his life, Marciano was also a client of Charles Atlas) and used a stuffed mailbag that hung from a tree in his back yard as a heavy bag. He attended Brockton High School, where he played both baseball and football. However, he was cut from the school baseball team because he had joined a church league, violating a school rule forbidding players from joining other teams. He dropped out of school after finishing tenth grade.

Marciano then worked as a chute man on delivery trucks for the Brockton Ice and Coal Company. He also worked as a ditchdigger, railroad layer and shoemaker. He was a resident of Hanson, Massachusetts; the house he lived in still stands on Main Street.

In March 1943, Marciano was drafted into the United States Army for a term of two years. Stationed in Swansea, Wales, he helped ferry supplies across the English Channel to Normandy. After the war ended, he completed his service in March 1946 at Fort Lewis, Washington.

Amateur career
Marciano's amateur record was 8–4.  While awaiting discharge, Marciano represented the Army and won the 1946 Amateur Armed Forces boxing tournament. His amateur career was briefly interrupted on March 17, 1947, when Marciano stepped into the ring as a professional competitor at the Valley Arena Gardens of Holyoke, Massachusetts, being billed as "Rocky Mackianno of Westover Field". That night, he knocked out local fighter Lee Epperson in three rounds. In an unusual move, Marciano returned to the amateur ranks and fought in the Golden Gloves All-East Championship Tournament in March 1948. He was controversially beaten by Coley Wallace. He continued to fight as an amateur throughout the spring and competed in the AAU Olympic tryouts in the Boston Garden. There, he knocked out George McInnis, but hurt his hands during the bout and was forced to withdraw from the tournament. That was his last amateur bout.

In late March 1947, Marciano and several friends traveled to Fayetteville, North Carolina, to try out for the Fayetteville Cubs, a farm team for the Chicago Cubs baseball team. Marciano lasted three weeks before being cut. After failing to find a spot on another team, he returned to Brockton and began boxing training with longtime friend Allie Colombo. Al Weill and Chick Wergeles served as his managers and Charley Goldman as his trainer and teacher.

Professional career
Although he had one professional fight (against Lee Epperson) on his record, Marciano began fighting permanently as a professional boxer on July 12, 1948. That night, he notched a win over Harry Bilazarian (3–6–0). He won his first 16 bouts by knockout, all before the fifth round and nine before the first round was over. Don Mogard (17–9–1) became the first boxer to last the distance (full 10 rounds scheduled) with "The Rock", but Marciano won by unanimous decision.

Early in his career, he changed the spelling of his last name, "Marchegiano". The ring announcer in Providence, Rhode Island, could not pronounce it, so Marciano's handler, Al Weill, suggested they create a pseudonym. The first suggestion was Rocky Mack, which Marciano rejected, deciding to go with the more Italian-sounding "Marciano".

Marciano won three more fights by knockout, and then he met Ted Lowry (58–48–9). Marciano kept his winning streak alive, beating Lowry by unanimous decision. Four more knockout wins then followed, including a five-rounder on December 19, 1949, with Phil Muscato (56–20–0), an experienced heavyweight from Buffalo, New York, being the first "name fighter" Marciano faced.

Marciano vs Vingo 
Three weeks after the Phil Muscato fight, Marciano fought Carmine Vingo (16–1–0) by a sixth-round knockout in New York. Carmine was a promising prospect who was 16–1, with his loss controversial. Marciano was 24–0 at the time of the fight. The winner would be declared the white hope in the division. Rocky Marciano dropped Vingo in the first and second round, but by the fifth Vingo was gaining momentum. At 1:46 in the sixth round Marciano knocked out Vingo with a right uppercut. Vingo was unconscious and taken to the hospital on a stretcher, as there were no ambulances available. As Vingo was given 50/50 survival odds, a priest administered last rites; however, Vingo pulled through and survived, befriending Marciano later on in life.

Marciano vs. La Starza
On March 24, 1950, Marciano fought Roland La Starza, winning by split decision. La Starza may have come closer than any other boxer to defeating Marciano as a professional. The scoring for the bout was 5–4, 4–5, and 5–5. Marciano won on a supplemental point system used by New York and Massachusetts at that time. The scoring system did not award an extra point for a knockdown and Marciano scored a knockdown in the fight. Referee Watson decided the bout, scoring it for Marciano. Both boxers were undefeated before the fight, with La Starza's record at 37–0.

Subsequent bouts
Marciano scored three more knockouts in a row before a rematch with Lowry (61–56–10), Marciano again winning by unanimous decision. After that, he scored four more knockouts and, after a decision over Red Applegate (11–14–2) in late April 1951, he was showcased on national television for the first time, knocking out Rex Layne (34–1–2) in six rounds on July 12, 1951.

On October 27, 1951, the 28-year-old Marciano took on the 37-year-old Joe Louis. Coming into the bout, Marciano was a 6½-to-5 underdog. Marciano upset Louis in the latter's last career bout.

After four more wins, including victories over 35-year-old Lee Savold (96–37–3) and Harry Matthews (81–3–5), Marciano received a shot at the world title.

Championship fights

Marciano, 29, faced the World Heavyweight Champion, 38-year-old Jersey Joe Walcott, in Philadelphia on September 23, 1952. Walcott dropped Marciano in the first round and steadily built a points lead. In the 13th, Walcott used his trademark feint to set up his right hand, but Marciano's "Suzie Q" landed first, a powerful right hook causing Walcott to slump to his knees with his arm draped over the ropes. He lay motionless long after he had been counted out and Marciano became the new World Heavyweight Champion. At the time of the stoppage, Walcott was leading on all scorecards, 8–4, 7–5, and 7–4.

His first defense came a year later – a rematch against Walcott, 39, who this time was knocked out in the first round.

Next, it was Roland La Starza's turn to challenge Marciano. After building a small lead on the judges' scorecards all the way through the middle rounds, Marciano won the rematch by a technical knockout in the 11th round.Then came two consecutive bouts against former World Heavyweight Champion and light heavyweight legend Ezzard Charles, 33, who became the only man to ever last 15 rounds against Marciano. Marciano won the first fight, held at Yankee Stadium on June 17, 1954, on points.  Referee Ruby Goldstein scored the bout 8–5–2 in rounds for the champion. Judge Artie Aidala scored it 9–5–1 for Marciano while judge Harold Barnes had it 8–6–1.  Marciano won the return fight by an eighth-round knockout. Then, Marciano met British and European Champion Don Cockell. Marciano knocked him out in the ninth round.

Marciano's last title bout was against 38-year-old Archie Moore, on September 21, 1955. The bout was originally scheduled for September 20, but because of hurricane warnings, it had to be delayed a day. Marciano was knocked down for a four-count in the second round, but recovered and retained his title with a knockout in round nine.

Marciano announced his retirement on April 27, 1956, aged 32. He finished his career at 49–0.

Life after boxing
Marciano considered a comeback in 1959 when Ingemar Johansson won the Heavyweight Championship from Floyd Patterson on June 26, 1959. After only a month of training in nearly four years, Marciano decided against it and never seriously considered a comeback again.

After his retirement, Marciano entered the world of television, first hosting a weekly boxing show on TV in 1961 and later appearing in the Combat! episode "Masquerade". For a brief period, he worked as a troubleshooting referee in wrestling (Marciano was a good wrestler in high school). He continued as a referee and boxing commentator in boxing matches for many years. He was also active in business as a partner and vice president of Papa Luigi Spaghetti Dens, a San Francisco-based franchise company formed by Joe Kearns and James Braly. He built a custom home at 641 NW 24 Street in Wilton Manors, Florida, a suburb of Fort Lauderdale. The house still stands as of 2018.

In late July 1969, shortly before his death, Marciano participated in the filming of  The Superfight: Marciano vs. Ali. The two boxers were filmed sparring, then the film was edited to match a computer simulation of a hypothetical fight between them, each in his prime. It aired on January 20, 1970, with one version having Marciano winning and the second version having Ali winning.

Religious views
Marciano was a devout Christian and often attended Catholic mass during training and before a fight. He once stated "the biggest thrill I can think of would be an audience with the pope".

Death

On August 31, 1969 (the day before his 46th birthday), Marciano was a passenger in a small private plane, a Cessna 172 heading to Des Moines, Iowa. It was night and bad weather had set in. The pilot, Glenn Belz, had 231 total hours of flying time, 35 of them at night, and had no instrument rating. Belz tried to land the plane at a small airfield outside Newton, Iowa but the aircraft hit a tree two miles short of the runway. Flying with Marciano in the back seat was Frankie Farrell, 28, the oldest son of organized crime figure Lew Farrell.  Marciano, Belz and Farrell were killed on impact.

The National Transportation Safety Board report said, "The pilot attempted an operation exceeding his experience and ability level, continued visual flight rules under adverse weather conditions and experienced spatial disorientation in the last moments of the flight." Marciano was on his way to give a speech to support his friend's son and there was a surprise birthday celebration waiting for him. He had hoped to return in the early morning for his 46th birthday celebration with his wife. He was coming from a dinner in Chicago at STP CEO Andy Granatelli's home.

Marciano is interred in a crypt at Forest Lawn Memorial Cemetery in Fort Lauderdale, Florida. His wife Barbara Marciano died five years later at the age of 46 due to lung cancer, and is entombed next to him.

Legacy

Marciano holds the record with heavyweight Brian Nielsen for the longest undefeated streak by a heavyweight. He is also the only world heavyweight champion to go undefeated throughout his professional career. Although heavyweight champion Gene Tunney never suffered a defeat at heavyweight and retired as champion, he lost one career fight at light heavyweight, and his longest win streak was 32, with his overall record being 82-1-4(D)-1(NC). Marciano also has the highest knockout percentage of any heavyweight champion in history (over the period of a career) with 87.76%. In his professional career, he was only knocked down twice. The first occurred in his first title defense against Jersey Joe Walcott, 38, and the second occurred against 38 year-old Archie Moore.

Despite his perfect record and retiring as champion, Marciano is rarely (if ever) rated as the top heavyweight of all time. John Durant, author of The Heavyweight Champions, wrote in 1971 (p. 123): "Critics do not rate Rocky with the great ones, like Jeffries, Johnson, Dempsey, Tunney and Louis. He never faced top fighters like they did. It was not Rocky's fault, of course, that there was a lack of talent when he was boxing. He fought them all and that is what a champion is supposed to do."
Also in 1971, Nat Fleischer, a boxing historian and founder of The Ring, named Marciano as the 10th all-time greatest heavyweight champion. Fleischer wrote that Marciano was "crude, wild swinging, awkward and missed heavily. In his bout with light heavyweight champion Archie Moore, for example, he missed almost two-thirds of the 50-odd punches he threw when he had Archie against the ropes, a perfect target for the kill."

In December 1962, a The Ring poll of 40 boxing experts had Jack Dempsey rated the number-one heavyweight of all time, with Joe Louis second, Jack Johnson third and Marciano seventh. Two boxing historians, Herb Goldman and Charley Rose, and John McCallum's Survey of Old Timers (survey of a group of historians and writers) rated Marciano at number seven, number eight and number nine, respectively, of the best heavyweights of all time.

In 1998, The Ring named Marciano as the sixth greatest heavyweight champion ever. In 2002, The Ring placed Marciano at number 12 on the list of the 80 Best Fighters of the Last 80 Years. In 2003, The Ring rated Marciano number 14 on the list of 100 greatest punchers of all time. In 2005, Marciano was named the fifth greatest heavyweight of all time by the International Boxing Research Organization. In 2007, on ESPN.com's list of the 50 Greatest Boxers of All Time, Marciano was ranked number 14, and was the 5th highest ranked heavyweight, behind (in order) Muhammad Ali, Joe Louis, Jack Johnson, and Jack Dempsey.

Marciano's punch was tested and it was featured in the December 1963 issue of Boxing Illustrated: "Marciano's knockout blow packs more explosive energy than an armor-piercing bullet and represents as much energy as would be required to spot lift 1000 pounds one foot off the ground."

Marciano was named fighter of the year by The Ring three times. His three championship fights between 1952 and 1954 were named fights of the year by the magazine. Marciano won the Sugar Ray Robinson Award in 1952. In 2006, an ESPN poll voted Marciano's 1952 championship bout against Walcott as the greatest knockout ever. Marciano also received the Hickok Belt for top professional athlete of the year in 1952. Murray Goodman later recalled that Ray Hickok, founder of the award, also presented Rocky with a hundred miniature boxing gloves, which Rocky was selling a week later for $1 a pair. In 1955, he was voted the second most important American athlete of the year.

Marciano is a member of the International Boxing Hall of Fame and the World Boxing Hall of Fame.

Marciano had two children—a daughter, Mary Anne (born 1952), who died on June 3, 2011, of complications from a respiratory illness and a son, Rocco Kevin (born 1968). Mary Anne had several run-ins with the law in Florida in the 1980s and 1990s, getting arrested and charged with assault and armed robbery after previously serving jail time for cocaine possession. Joey Marciano, a professional baseball player, is a cousin twice removed.

A bronze statue of Marciano was planned for a 2009 completion date in his hometown of Brockton, Massachusetts, as a gift to the city by the World Boxing Council. The artist, Mario Rendon, head of the Instituto Universitario de las Bellas Artes in Colima, Mexico, was selected to sculpt the statue. After years of delays in the planning stages, the groundbreaking for the statue was held on April 1, 2012, on the grounds of Brockton High School. The statue was officially unveiled on September 23, 2012, which was the 60th anniversary of Marciano winning the world heavyweight title. A bronze statue of Marciano was also erected in Ripa Teatina, Italy, to celebrate the birthplace of Marciano's father.

Professional boxing record

See also

List of heavyweight boxing champions
List of undisputed boxing champions
List of The Ring world champions

Notes

References

Bibliography

External links

 

 Boxrec.com NYSAC World Heavyweight Title Fights
 Boxrec.com NBA World Heavyweight Title Fights
Boxing Hall of Fame

 
1923 births
1969 deaths
Accidental deaths in Iowa
American people of Italian descent
American male boxers
United States Army personnel of World War II
Boxers from Massachusetts
Catholics from Massachusetts
International Boxing Hall of Fame inductees
Rocky (film series)
Sportspeople from Brockton, Massachusetts
The Ring (magazine) champions
Undefeated world boxing champions
Victims of aviation accidents or incidents in 1969
Victims of aviation accidents or incidents in the United States
World heavyweight boxing champions